"Forever Starts Today" is a song by Swedish singer Linus Svenning. The song took part in Melodifestivalen 2015 and qualified to the final through Andra Chansen (Second Chance) round after finishing 4th in the second semi-final on 14 February 2015. On 7 March 2015 it finished 6th out of 12 in Melodifestivalen final.

Charts

References

2015 songs
2015 singles
Melodifestivalen songs of 2015
English-language Swedish songs
Songs written by Fredrik Kempe
Songs written by Anton Hård af Segerstad
Songs written by Aleena Gibson